David Richter is an American politician and educator who has served as a member of the North Dakota House of Representatives since December 2018. He currently represents the 1st district alongside Patrick Hatlestad. Richter is a Republican.

Biography
Richter holds a BA degree from Minot State University and an MA degree from Wayne State College.

In February 2018, Richter announced that he would run for state representative. He came first in the June Republican primary, followed by incumbent Patrick Hatlestad. He and Hatlestad went on to win the November general election. Richter was sworn in as a representative on December 1, 2018 and succeeded Gary Sukut.

Richter is married to Debbie Richter and they have three children together. They reside in Williston.

References

External links
Representative David Richter

Living people
Year of birth missing (living people)
Republican Party members of the North Dakota House of Representatives
Minot State University alumni
Wayne State College alumni
People from Williston, North Dakota
21st-century American politicians